The AR platform has become widely popular for makers of hunting and sporting rifles. Although the designations "AR-10" and "AR-15" are respectively trademarks of ArmaLite and Colt, variants of both are made by many manufacturers. The AR-15 rifles usually comes chambered for either the military cartridge 5.56×45mm or the .223 Remington. Because of the pressures associated with the 5.56×45mm, it is not advisable to fire 5.56×45mm rounds in an AR-15 marked as .223 Rem, since this can result in damage to the rifle or injury to the shooter. The AR-15 can be chambered in many other calibers; it is then often referred to as an AR-15 style rifle.

AR-15 cartridges

Rimfire cartridges
 .17 HMR
 .17 Mach 2
 .17 Winchester Super Magnum
 .22 Long Rifle
 .22 Winchester Magnum Rimfire

Centerfire cartridges imperial measurement
 .17 Mach IV
 .17 Remington Fireball
 .17 Remington
 .17-223
 .20 Practical
 .20 GPC (wildcat)
 .22 GPC (wildcat)
 22 Grendel (wildcat) aka 224 Grendel
 .22 Nosler
 .22 PPC
 .204 Ruger
 .222 Remington
 .223 Remington – Original AR-15 cartridge: .223 cartridges may function in a 5.56×45mm rifle, however 5.56×45mm cartridges may produce excessive pressure in a .223 Rem rifle. On the other hand, a .223 Wylde chamber is used on .223 Rem rifle barrels to allow them to safely fire either .223 Remington or 5.56×45mm NATO ammunition.
 .223 Winchester Super Short Magnum
 .224 Kritzeck (wildcat of a .223 Remington with shortened neck)
 .224 Valkyrie
 .24 GPC
 .243 LBC
 .243 Winchester Super Short Magnum
 .25 Winchester Super Short Magnum
 .25-45 Sharps
 .257 Ocelot (wildcat)
 .25 GPC (wildcat)
 .26 GPC (wildcat)
 .27 GPC (wildcat)
 .277 Wolverine (semi-wildcat)
 .277 MSR (Dasher Wildcat)
 .28 GPC (wildcat)
 .30 American
 .30 Carbine
 .30 GPC (wildcat)
 .30 Remington AR
 .30 Sabertooth (wildcat)
 .300 OSSM
 .300 AAC Blackout (7.62×35mm)
 .300 Whisper
 .300 HAM'R – Wilson Combat
.338 SOCOM (wildcat)
.338 Spectre (wildcat)
 .350 Legend
 .357 Automag (wildcat)
.358 MGP (wildcat) 
 .358 SOCOM (wildcat)
 .358 Yeti (wildcat)
.375 Stalker (wildcat)
 .375 SOCOM
.400 AR (wildcat)
 .40 S&W
 .44 Automag (wildcat)
 .44 Remington Magnum (wildcat)
.44 SOCOM (wildcat)
 .440 Corbon Magnum (wildcat)
 .45 ACP
 .450 Bushmaster
 .458 SOCOM
.475 SOCOM (wildcat)
 .499 LWRC
 .50 Action Express
 .50 Beowulf
.50 SOCOM (wildcat)

Centerfire cartridges metric measurement
 5.45×39mm – intermediate
5.56×45mm NATO – Original M16A1 cartridge: Can also safely fire .223 Remington, intermediate
 FN 5.7×28mm – PDW
 6mm Mongoose (wildcat)
 6mm ARC – rifle
6mm Dasher
 6mm AR (wildcat)
 6×45mm – intermediate
 6.5mm Grendel – intermediate
 6.5 Timberwolf (wildcat)
 6.8×39mm (.277 Wolverine) – intermediate
 6.8mm Remington SPC – intermediate
 7mm Valkyrie (wildcat)
 7.62×33mm (.30 Carbine) – carbine
 7.62×37mm Musang (wildcat) – intermediate
 7.62×39mm – intermediate
 7.62×40mm Wilson Tactical – rifle
 7.92×33mm Kurz – intermediate

 9×19mm Parabellum – pistol
 9×39mm – subsonic rifle
 10mm Auto (10×25mm) – pistol
10mm SOCOM (wildcat)
 10x43mm (.400AR wildcat)

AR-10 cartridges
 .220 Swift
 .22-250 Remington
 6mm-250
 .243 Winchester – same bolt as 7.62×51
 6mm Remington
 6mm Creedmoor. Same bolt as 7.62x51. 
 .257 Roberts
 6.5×47mm Lapua
 6.5mm Creedmoor – same bolt as 7.62×51, and can be formed from 7.62×51 brass.
 .260 Remington – same bolt as 7.62×51, and can be formed from 7.62×51 brass.
6.5 WSM
 .270 Winchester Short Magnum 
 7mm-08 Remington – same bolt as 7.62×51, and can be formed from 7.62×51 brass.
7.62×51mm NATO – Original AR-10 cartridge
 7mm Winchester Short Magnum 
 7mm Remington Short Action Ultra Magnum
 .308 Winchester – considered interchangeable with 7.62×51mm NATO according to SAAMI.
 .300 Winchester Short Magnum
 .300 Remington Short Action Ultra Magnum
 .325 Winchester Short Magnum
 .338 WSM
 .338 Federal – same bolt as 7.62×51, and can be formed from 7.62×51 brass
 8.6 Blackout
 .358 Winchester – same bolt as 7.62×51, and can be formed from 7.62×51 brass
 .358 Winchester Short Magnum 
 .375 Raptor – same bolt as 7.62×51, and can be formed from 7.62×51 brass
 .375 Winchester Short Magnum 
 .416 Winchester Short Magnum 
 .450 Marlin
 .45 Raptor
 .458 HAM'R
 .458 WSM 
 45-70 Auto
 .458 Winchester Short Magnum
 475 Bishop Short Magnum
 .50 Krater
 .500 Auto Max
 .500 Phantom
 .500 Whisper
 .510 Whisper
 .510 Winchester Short Magnum

Other AR pattern rifles
Some companies have created AR pattern rifles that depart from the standard AR-15 and AR-10 dimensions in order to accommodate other types of ammunition that would not fit into the those standards.

Examples include (sorted by overall cartridge length):

Other AR pattern firearms
A variety of manufacturers have introduced semiautomatic shotguns whose overall designs are heavily influenced by the AR pattern rifle.
 12 Gauge
 20 Gauge
.410 bore

Parent cases for reloading non-standard calibers

Some of the calibers listed above use a proprietary case that is specific to that given cartridge. Other cartridges were derived from re-forming an existing case and possibly trimming the length in order to arrive at a case-shape that meets the standardized SAAMI-spec dimensions.

AR-15:

22 Nosler, Proprietary, uses the head and rim dimensions of the 5.56x45, and a case-body that is similar to the 6.8 SPC case. To increase powder capacity, the shoulder is located higher than the 6.8, and the case is longer. The neck is sized for .224 caliber bullets.

224 Valkyrie, Uses 6.8 SPC cases, trimmed shorter, and the shoulder re-formed at a lower location due to being designed for using relatively long "high BC" (Ballistic Coefficient) bullets. The neck is sized for .224 caliber bullets.

25-45 Sharps, Uses the standard military 5.56x45 case (also .223 cases), the neck is simply expanded to .257"

6.5mm Grendel, The Grendel uses the same head and rim from the .220 Russian and the 7.62x39 with a rim diameter of 0.441-0.449. The 6.5 Grendel bullets have a true diameter of 6.71mm / 0.264" and the 6.5 Grendel case can be formed from abundant 7.62x39 cases with a neck re-sizing die, and fire-forming a slight change to the shoulder, if the case is made from brass. Many of the popular 7.62x39 cases are made from steel, which will not work for reforming the shoulder.

277 Wolverine, Standard military 5.56x45 case (also .223), shoulder is reformed lower, length is trimmed, neck is sized to .277

6.8 SPC (.277), Proprietary. Developed as an all new cartridge in the hopes of gaining a military contract. Rim diameter is 0.421"

300 AAC Blackout, Uses military 5.56x45 (also .223). The shoulder is reformed, length is trimmed, neck is sized to .308. This caliber is very popular, and examples are available in a wide variety of styles. Bullet weights can currently be found between 100gr to 220gr

7.62x40 Wilson Tactical, Uses 5.56 NATO cases (also .223). Shoulder is re-formed, length is trimmed, neck is sized to .308. This cartridge is very similar to the 300 AAC Blackout, but the shoulder is slightly higher and the case is slightly taller, which allows for more gunpowder capacity when loading the lighter/shorter high-velocity bullets.

338 Spectre, Uses 10mm Magnum pistol cases with a 6.8 SPC bolt-face. A shoulder is formed, and the case is lightly trimmed to length, and the neck is sized to .338, down from 0.401". The 10mm rim is 0.424" (10.8mm) in diameter, and the SPC rim diameter is 0.422" (10.7mm). The .338 caliber bullets are available in weights between 200gr-250gr.

350 Legend, Proprietary. The head and rim dimensions exactly match the military 5.56x45 case, allowing the use of the standard bolt-face of an AR-15. However, the case has an added taper and is longer than 5.56x45 cases, so these cannot be reformed from any other existing case. The nominal bullet diameter is .357-inch, but SAAMI specs allow the bullet diameter variance to be .355-.357

357 Auto, Wildcat. Uses 10mm magnum pistol cases with a 6.8 SPC bolt-face. The existing 357-Sig pistol is a 9mm bullet shouldered into the larger 40 S&W pistol case. The 10mm cartridge and the 40 S&W are almost identical, but the 10mm case is longer and operates at a higher pressure. This means that you can use existing 357-Sig dies to re-form the straight-wall 10mm case into a shouldered .355" (9mm), and then the neck can be sized up to accept .358 rifle bullets. This is in response to the popularity of the 300 Blackout at subsonic velocities. If the bullet velocity is capped at 1,000-Feet Per Second / FPS in order to subdue the noise of firing, then the impact can be improved by increasing the weight of the bullet. The 357 Auto can be loaded with bullets in .358-caliber, while still fitting within the AR-15 COAL of 2.260". Bullet weights are currently available between 225gr-310gr

358 Yeti, Uses standard military 7.62x51 cases (also .308), length is trimmed, shoulder is reformed, neck is sized to .358". Bullet weights are currently available between 225gr-310gr

375 Stalker, Standard military 7.62x51 cases (also .308), length is trimmed, shoulder is reformed, neck is expanded to .375

375 SOCOM, Proprietary. The case head and rim dimensions exactly match the military 7.62x51 (also .308), however, the case body is slightly wider and has more taper.

400 AR, Wildcat. The parent is the 7.35×51mm Carcano rifle case. It has a rim diameter of 0.447" which allows the use of an AR-15 bolt-face from the existing 7.62x39. The case is necked out and trimmed off above the shoulder at a case-length of 1.700", with a COAL of 2.250", resulting in a "straight-wall" cartridge. It can accept .3975–.4005 jacketed rifle bullets from muzzle-loader sabots (200gr/mv2350fps), and also .400–.401 bullets from .40 S&W and 10mm Auto pistols (135gr–230gr).

450 Bushmaster, Uses .284 Winchester cases. Cut the length to 1.700" to form a straight-wall cartridge, from 2.170". The .284 Winchester case is very similar to the .308, however, the .284 case has a body diameter of 0.500", and the .308 case has a body diameter of 0.471". Both share an identical head/rim. The 450B is limited to 35,000-psi, which is more common in pistols, and lower than similarly sized rifle cartridges. The 450B uses .452" diameter bullets, most often seen in the abundant 45-caliber pistol styles. The 300gr version is rated at 1900fps at the muzzle, and the 250gr at 2200fps.

458 SOCOM, Proprietary. The case head and rim dimensions exactly match the military 7.62x51 (also .308), but the case body is slightly wider and has more taper.

50 Beowulf. Proprietary. The case head and rim dimensions exactly match the .44-Magnum pistol case, and all dimensions from the lower part of the case matches the 50-Action Express (50 AE), which can be described as a .44-Magnum cartridge that has had the body of the case expanded to 50-caliber while leaving the head intact. However, the 50 Beowulf case is longer than the 50AE, so the 50AE cases cannot be used as a donor.

Note about donor cases: The 7.62x51 military cartridge is known in the civilian world as the .308 cartridge. Since its dimensions are taken from the 30-06 cartridge from the 1906 US Army cartridge, the lower half of these case dimensions have been used for designing the .243 Winchester, 25-06, .270 Winchester, .280 Remington, 7mm-08, .308, .30-06, .35 Whelen, and others. Any AR-15/AR-10 cartridge cases that are derived from the 7.62x51 can also be formed from these listed calibers.

AR-10:

The AR-10 is slightly larger and heavier than the AR-15. It was originally designed to chamber the military 7.62x51 NATO cartridge (also .308), which has a COAL of 2.800" (71.12mm)

45 Raptor, uses the standard 7.62 NATO case, cut to a length of 1.800" from 2.015", resulting in a straight-wall cartridge, neck is sized to 0.452". The resulting COAL of 2.300" is only 1.02mm longer than the maximum COAL for chambering a cartridge in the smaller AR-15, however, the 45 Raptor chamber pressure is allowed to be as high as 62,000-PSI. This means that the stronger AR-10 receiver and bolt carrier group is needed for shooting this cartridge.

See also
 STANAG magazine, a standardized firearm magazine based on the 5.56×45 mm cartridge and similar length cartridges
 SR-25 pattern magazine, a scaled-up version of the STANAG magazine for 7.62×51mm length cartridges
 AICS style magazine, an emerging standard for bolt-action rifle magazines.

References

Ammunition
Cartridges
Lists of weapons